Robins Hoods is an American drama series that aired in first-run syndication from August 22, 1994 until March 13, 1995.

Overview
Brett Robin is a prosecutor whose husband is a policeman.  After he's killed, she learns he bought a bar and hired five first time offenders to work there as part of their parole. She keeps the bar open and occasionally her five employees take it upon themselves to help her using their criminal skills.

Cast
Linda Purl as Brett Robin
Gretchen Palmer as K.T. Parker
Jennifer Campbell as Annie Beckett
David Gail as Eddie Bartlett
Mayte Vilán as Maria Alvarez
Julie McCullough as Stacey Wright
Claire Yarlett as Mackenzie "Mac" Magnuson

Episodes

References

External links

1990s American drama television series
1994 American television series debuts
1995 American television series endings
English-language television shows
First-run syndicated television programs in the United States
Television series by CBS Studios
Television series by Spelling Television